The Players Association was a New York based studio group, put together by drummer/arranger Chris Hills and producer Danny Weiss in 1977 on Vanguard Records.

Overview
The Players Association recordings brought in leading jazz session musicians such as Joe Farrell, David Sanborn, James Mtume, Bob Berg, Mike Mandel, synthesist Marcus Barone, and Lorraine Moore on vocals as well as  others. Whilst writing some of their own songs, the group mainly focused on covers. Their two biggest hits were "Disco Inferno," a cover of the Trammps tune, and their own composition "Turn the Music Up!"  Both tracks were recorded on the Vanguard label and issued in the UK as 12-inch singles which boosted the group's popularity on the dance floors around the UK.

"Disco Inferno" was an underground club hit in the United States and the United Kingdom, most notable for the piercing solos from trumpeter Jon Faddis, Michael Brecker and David Sanborn on tenor and alto sax. The band proved more popular in the United Kingdom, where they scored three chart singles including the disco hit "Turn the Music Up!" (entered UK chart at number 41 on 4 March 1979), which reached number 8 in the UK Singles Chart and ran for nine weeks, and one chart album, which also prompted a British tour. Their other minor hit chart singles were, "Ride the Groove" (released in the UK in 1979) which reached number 42 in the UK chart and "We Got the Groove" (released in the UK in 1980) which peaked at number 61. After the release of five albums between 1977 and 1981, the association ended.

Discography

Albums

Singles

References

External links
 

American disco musicians
American funk musical groups
American soul musical groups
American dance music groups